Adenylosuccinate synthase like 1 is a protein that in humans is encoded by the ADSS1 gene.

Function

This gene encodes a member of the adenylosuccinate synthase family of proteins. The encoded muscle-specific enzyme plays a role in the purine nucleotide cycle by catalyzing the first step in the conversion of inosine monophosphate (IMP) to adenosine monophosphate (AMP). Mutations in this gene may cause adolescent onset distal myopathy. Alternative splicing results in multiple transcript variants. [provided by RefSeq, Feb 2016].

Currently there is no treatment for the distal myopathy caused by the mutation in ADSSL1 gene. However, a non-profit foundation (Cure-ADSSL1.org)  is currently working with a team of researchers to find a cure. Refer to the link below to find more information about this foundation.

References

Further reading